New Ash Green is a village in the Sevenoaks District of Kent, England. It is located 8 miles south west of Gravesend.

History
Building of the village began in 1967, with Span as the developer and Eric Lyons as the designer. The architectural design of New Ash Green was innovative for its time, and its original concept was intended as a prototype for a new way of living in the latter twentieth century. The first buildings were created to be airy, pleasant and modern. There was generous landscaping and cars were separated from pedestrians in the streets and in the shopping precinct. The village is arranged in twenty four neighbourhoods. Punch Croft and Over Minnis are some of the original Span-designed sections.

The development soon ran into difficulties. Originally,  the Greater London Council was going to buy 450 of the properties for renting. This idea was dropped when the leadership of the GLC went into Conservative hands. This reduced the financial viability of the development and of the planned social mix of residents. Another problem in the early years was that some lenders were sceptical about the unconventional design of the properties and would not give mortgages.

Span, the original developer, sold the project to Bovis in 1971 for £2.65 million. Bovis increased the size of the development, increasing density and giving less attention to design or provision of public space.

Facilities
New Ash Green is a quiet residential area. It has a rugby club, épée fencing and air pistol shooting indoor, tennis club, football club, Ash Green Sports Centre including a gym, shops, children's parks, a primary school, a fire station, a special needs school and many more public buildings.

The shopping centre became run-down due to lack of maintenance from overseas absentee landlords. Plans were put forward in 2008 to redesign the village's shops.

Transport

Rail
The nearest National Rail station to New Ash Green is Longfield, located 2.3 miles away.

Buses
New Ash Green is served by Arriva Kent Thameside routes 433 & 489. These connect it with Bluewater, Gravesend & Longfield.

References

External links

British Pathé News / New Village (1968)

Villages in Kent